is a city located in Shimane Prefecture, Japan. It is the smallest and least populous city in Shimane Prefecture. The city was founded on April 1, 1954. As of 2017, the city has an estimated population of 24,009 and a population density of 89 persons per km². The total area is 158.41 km². The city's economy is primarily focused on commerce.

Overview 
The city lies on the sea, and offers beautiful and uncrowded beaches. The Gōnokawa River flows through the city, from the mountains to the sea.  The river is the site of festivals, fireworks, and excellent fishing.

On October 1, 2004, the town of Sakurae (from Ōchi District) was merged into Gōtsu.

Overlooking Gōtsu City is Hoshitaka Mountain, or "Star Mountain", so named for the star pattern carved into the face of the mountain.  According to Gōtsu legend, the star was formed by a meteor that had fallen many years ago. A piece of this meteor was saved, and a special shrine was built at the foot of the mountain to honor the meteor. In the winter, snowfall on the mountain creates a beautiful star-shaped pattern, visible from anywhere in the city.  In the spring, white azaleas bloom to form a white star, while the area bordering the star remains green.  In the summer, in celebration of the Japanese Obon Festival, the star is lit up at night.

Under the auspices of the Japanese Ministry of Education and the Jet Programme, Gōtsu hosts four native English speakers each year, who teach English in the area's public schools. Gōtsu's Sister City in the United States is Corona, California (located near Los Angeles).

History 
Burial mounds from the middle third of the Middle Yayoi period were discovered in Gōtsu in 1973.

On May 27, 1905, the Russian transport vessel Irtysh of the Russian Baltic Fleet sustained damaged from Japanese warships in the waters off Tsushima Island. After drifting to within 2 km of the coast Gōtsu's Waki district the ship began to sink. Gōtsu residents rescued over 200 Russian soldiers. The event has been memorialized since the following year and is now known as the Russia festival. In 1959, the former chairman of the Japan Shipbuilding Industry Foundation Ryoichi Sasakawa erected a 2.9 meter tall cenotaph.

Sekishuken Laboratory in Gōtsu researches the history of the Sekishuken breed of dogs. The ancestor of all living Shiba Inu, Ishi, was from the Sekishuken breed, indigenous to western Shimane.

Transportation 
The city was previously connected by train at Gōtsu station on the JR Sankō Line but the station closed on March 31, 2018 with the discontinuation of the entire line from Gōtsu to Miyoshi.

International relations

Friendship cities
  Corona, California, United States

References

External links

 Gōtsu City official website 

Cities in Shimane Prefecture